Henry Ellis may refer to:

 Henry Augustus Ellis (1861–1939), Irish Australian physician and federalist
 Henry Ellis (diplomat) (1788–1855), British diplomat
 Henry Ellis (governor) (1721–1806), explorer, author, and second colonial Governor of Georgia
 Henry Ellis (librarian) (1777–1869), English librarian
 Henry Ellis, 2nd Viscount Clifden (1761–1836), Irish politician
 Henry Bramley Ellis (1841–1910), English organist, composer, conductor and teacher
 Henry Havelock Ellis (1859–1939), English physician, eugenicist, writer, progressive intellectual and social reformer
 Henry Walton Ellis (1782–1815), British soldier

See also
 Henry Agar-Ellis, 3rd Viscount Clifden (1825–1866), Irish courtier and racehorse owner
 Harry Ellis (disambiguation)